K54 or K-54 may refer to:

 K-54 (Kansas highway), a state highway in Kansas
 K-54 (pistol)
 Piano Sonata in F major, K. 547a, by Wolfgang Amadeus Mozart
 Potassium-54, an isotope of potassium
 Teller Airport, in Alaska